Superior Falls is a waterfall situated on the Montreal River, which forms the border between Iron County, Wisconsin and Gogebic County, Michigan, United States. The falls drop  before the Montreal River empties into Lake Superior at Oronto Bay.

In the spring of 2006, extreme kayak competitor, Tao Berman launched himself out of a helicopter and kayaked over the chaotic currents. His efforts were showcased on an August episode of the Discovery Channel's series, Stunt Junkies: Go Big or Go Home, entitled "Kayak Plunge".

References

External links
 Waterfalls of Iron County, Wisconsin
 Superior Falls at gowaterfalling.com

Landforms of Gogebic County, Michigan
Landforms of Iron County, Wisconsin
Waterfalls of Wisconsin
Waterfalls of Michigan